José Ricardo dos Santos Oliveira  or simply  Ricardinho  (born May 19, 1984 in João Pessoa, Brazil) is a Brazilian striker, who plays for Santa Cruz Futebol Clube.

Club statistics

References

External links
 CBF 

 

Living people
1984 births
Brazilian footballers
Brazilian expatriate footballers
Santa Cruz Futebol Clube players
Sociedade Esportiva Palmeiras players
Grêmio Foot-Ball Porto Alegrense players
Figueirense FC players
Botafogo de Futebol e Regatas players
Botafogo Futebol Clube (SP) players
Mogi Mirim Esporte Clube players
Kashiwa Reysol players
Paulista Futebol Clube players
Associação Desportiva São Caetano players
Guaratinguetá Futebol players
J1 League players
Expatriate footballers in South Korea
Jeju United FC players
Expatriate footballers in Japan
Brazilian expatriate sportspeople in South Korea
Association football forwards